Borja Iglesias Quintas (born 17 January 1993) is a Spanish professional footballer who plays for La Liga club Real Betis and the Spain national team as a striker.

Formed at Celta, where he played mainly in the reserves, he achieved totals of over 140 La Liga games and 40 goals for that team, Espanyol and Betis, winning the 2021–22 Copa del Rey with the latter.

Club career

Villarreal
Born in Santiago de Compostela, Province of A Coruña, Galicia, Iglesias graduated from Villarreal CF's youth setup after stints at CD Roda and Valencia CF. He started his senior career in 2012, with the former's C team in Tercera División.

Celta
Iglesias joined RC Celta de Vigo on 9 July 2013, signing a two-year deal with an option for a further three and being assigned to the reserves in Segunda División B. On 3 January 2015 he made his first-team – and La Liga – debut, coming on as a 78th-minute substitute for Santi Mina in a 1–0 away loss against Sevilla FC.

On 11 December 2016, after scoring a brace in a 3–2 away defeat to Caudal Deportivo, Iglesias became Celta B's all-time top scorer with 53 goals, surpassing Goran Marić. He topped the third-tier charts at 32, being essential as his team sealed a play-off berth.

On 6 July 2017, Iglesias was loaned to Segunda División club Real Zaragoza for one year. He scored his first goal for his new team on 27 August, the equaliser through a penalty kick in a 1–1 home draw with Granada CF. Additionally, he scored braces against Córdoba CF, Sevilla Atlético, Real Valladolid and CA Osasuna, to reach 15 goals by March and finish the season as the division's joint-third highest scorer on 22. Earlier on 24 September, he was sent off just before half time in a 1–1 draw with Gimnàstic de Tarragona at La Romareda for what the referee considered an aggression towards goalkeeper Stole Dimitrievski.

Espanyol
On 9 July 2018, Iglesias signed a four-year contract with RCD Espanyol with a buyout clause of €28 million. He made his official debut for the club on 18 August, starting in a 1–1 home draw against former club Celta. In his next appearance, he helped the hosts defeat Valencia CF 2–0 after profiting from a Cristiano Piccini mistake midway through the second half.

Iglesias scored three goals over two legs in an aggregate 7–1 win over Ungmennafélagið Stjarnan in the second qualifying round of the UEFA Europa League in late July and early August 2019.

Betis

On 14 August 2019, Iglesias moved to Real Betis after agreeing to a five-year deal for a fee of €28 million, reuniting with his former Espanyol manager Rubi. He struggled with just three goals as the team finished 15th in his debut campaign, and received a red card on 20 February at the end of a goalless draw at CD Leganés for pushing an opposition coach. In 2020–21, he contributed 13 goals – 11 in the league – to clinch a Europa League place.

On 3 March 2022, in the second leg of the semi-finals of the Copa del Rey against Rayo Vallecano, Iglesias scored in stoppage time to ensure his team a 1–1 draw and a spot in the final. In the decisive match on 23 April, he scored the opening goal of a 1–1 draw with Valencia as his team won on penalties; he also topped the tournament's individual charts at five, and was the final's most valuable player.

Iglesias opened the 2022–23 season with six goals in six games, earning himself the accolade of La Liga Player of the Month for August. On 6 November, both he and teammate Nabil Fekir (as well as Gonzalo Montiel for the opposition) received straight red cards in an eventual 1–1 home draw with Sevilla FC in the Seville derby.

International career
In September 2022, Iglesias and Nico Williams were called up for the first time to the Spain national team, ahead of UEFA Nations League games with Switzerland and Portugal. He made his debut against the former, in a 2–1 loss in Zaragoza. Despite his 20 goals making him the top scoring national player of the calendar year, he was overlooked for the 2022 FIFA World Cup – the first Spaniard since 1994 to be in this position.

Personal life
Iglesias was nicknamed Panda, after the song of the same name by rapper Desiigner. He received attention for painting his fingernails black in support of Black Lives Matter in 2020; his gesture was also a statement against homophobia, for which he was praised by the actor Brays Efe. When asked about his political opinions, he said "Footballers tend to lean a little bit to the right because sometimes we value that economic policy. For me, for example, that's not the only thing worth anything. What I'm trying to say is, I prefer to pay more to live in a country where I like what they do with that money".

Career statistics

Club

International

Honours
Betis
Copa del Rey: 2021–22

Individual
La Liga Player of the Month: August 2022

References

External links

1993 births
Living people
Spanish footballers
Footballers from Santiago de Compostela
Association football forwards
La Liga players
Segunda División players
Segunda División B players
Tercera División players
Villarreal CF C players
Celta de Vigo B players
RC Celta de Vigo players
Real Zaragoza players
RCD Espanyol footballers
Real Betis players
Spain international footballers